Canada competed in the 2010 Commonwealth Games which were held in Delhi, India from October 3–14, 2010. Canada competed in 15 out of 17 sports with the exceptions being netball (team did not qualify) and tennis (scheduling conflicts). Canada's team consisted of 251 athletes, which was a decrease of 3 from the 2006 games. However, the events at these games were much more than they were in 2006. Several athletes withdrew due to safety concerns, including medal contenders Priscilla Lopes-Schliep, Perdita Felician and Dietmar Trillus.  Ken Pereira, Captain of the Men's field hockey team, was named the flag bearer on September 18, 2010, becoming the first Indo-Canadian and field hockey player to receive the honour.

Medalists

|  style="text-align:left; vertical-align:top;"|

|  style="text-align:left; vertical-align:top;"|

Archery

Canada sent 10 archers to the 2010 commonwealth games. Kevin Tataryn and Dietmar Trillus on September 22, 2010, withdrew, due to safety concerns.  The replacements Nathan Cameron and Michael Schleppe were announced on September 24, 2010.

Men

Women

Athletics

Canada sent a team of 40 athletes to the 2010 Commonwealth Games 
Men

Decathlon

Women

Heptathlon

Badminton

Canada's Badminton will consist of 11 athletes for the 2010 Commonwealth Games . Joseph Rogers and Milaine Cloutier will also attend as alternates. On September 28, 2010, Alvin Lau withdrew due to educational commitments.

Men

Women

Mixed

Mixed Team

Canada was ranked 5th in the draw and drew #3 England, #10 Mauritius, #14 Uganda and tied for #20 (last place) The Falkland Islands. Placing 2nd behind England after the group rounds, Canada lost to India in the Quarterfinals.

Group C

Quarterfinals

Boxing

Canada sent a team of 5 boxers to the 2010 Commonwealth Games 
On October 1, 2010, it was announced that Colin Fish and Steve Rolls were removed from the team for missing a mandatory training camp.

Cycling

Canada sent a team of 12 Cyclists to the 2010 Commonwealth Games.
On October 1, 2010, Alison Testroete withdrew due to an injury.

Road
Men

Women

Track
Men
 Zach Bell – Men's Points, Scratch
 Travis Smith – 1 km Time Trial, Sprint, Keirin

Women
 Tara Whitten – Women's Individual Pursuit, Points, Scratch, Team Sprint
 Monique Sullivan – 500m/1 km Time Trial, Sprint, Team Sprint

Diving

Canada sent a team of 11 divers to the 2010 Commonwealth Games. However, on September 15, 2010 Riley McCormick withdrew from the event with a back injury. On September 28, 2010, Meaghan Benfeito withdrew due to a lingering back injury, and was replaced with 17-year-old Rachel Kemp.

Men

Women

Gymnastics

Canada will send 13 gymnasts to the 2010 Commonwealth Games.

Artistic
Men 
 Tariq Dowers
 Ian Galvan
 Anderson Loran
 Robert Watson
 Jason Scott

Women

 Gabby May
 Catherine Dion
 Kristin Klarenbach
 Cynthia Lemieux-Guillemette
 Emma Willis

Rhythmic

 Mariam Chamilova
 Demetra Mantcheva
 Nerissa Mo

Field hockey

Canada has qualified both a men's and women's field hockey team for the 2010 Commonwealth Games.

Men
The team.

 Adam Froese
 David Carter
 Matthew Guest
 Richard Hildreth
 David Jameson
 Antoni Kindler
 Mark Pearson
 Ken Pereira

 Rob Short
 Iain Smythe
 Hudson Stewart
 Sukhwinder Singh
 Scott Tupper
 Jesse Watson
 Philip Wright

Canada has been drawn into Group B with South Africa, England, Trinidad and Tobago and New Zealand.

Pool B

Match Schedule:

Women
The team.

 Abigail Raye
 Ali Lee
 Amanda Stone
 Anna Kozniuk
 Azelia Liu
 Diana Roemer
 Kate Gillis
 Katie Baker

 Katie Collison
 Kristine Wishart
 Robyn Pendleton
 Samantha Smith
 Stephanie Jameson
 Stephanie Nesbitt
 Thea Culley
 Tyla Flexman

Canada has been drawn into Group B with England, Wales, Malaysia and New Zealand.

Pool B

Match Schedule:

Lawn bowls

Canada sent a team of 12 lawn bowlers to the 2010 Commonwealth Games 

Men

Women

Rugby sevens

Canada rugby sevens' team consisted of 12 athletes and was announced on September 9. Canada played Guyana, New Zealand and Scotland in the round robin but did not advance to the next round.

 Nanyak Dala
 Thyssen de Goede
 Sean Duke
 Ciaran Hearn
 Nathan Hirayama
 Phil Mack

 Ian Shoults
 Neil Meechan
 Justin Mensah-Coker
 John Moonlight
 Taylor Paris
 Conor Trainor

Group A

Shooting

Canada's shooting team was a B team. Canada's shooting team was announced on August 25, 2010. The team consists of 16 shooters 4 less than in Melbourne.

Men

Women

Squash

Canada's squash team consisted of 7 athletes (3 male and 4 female).
On October 1, 2010, Shahier Razik withdrew due to an injury, a replacement was not announced.

Men

Doubles

Pool 4

Women

Doubles

Pool 1

Mixed

Pool 1

Pool 3

Swimming

Canada's swimming team will consist of 27 swimmers. The Relay teams was announced the day prior to competition.

Men

Men's Relays

Women

Synchronized swimming

Canada attempted to continue its streak of winning every gold medal awarded in the sport ever at the Commonwealth Games. The team was announced on August 19, 2010.

 Élise Marcotte – Duet (substitute)

Table tennis

Canada's table tennis squad consisted of 10 athletes, two of them being alternates but did not actually participate.

Men
 Pradeeban Peter-Paul
 Pierre-Luc Hinse
 Xavier Therien
 Andre Ho
 Pierre-Luc Theriault *Alternate

Women
 Zhang Mo
 Sara Yuen
 Carmen Lee
 Anqi Luo
 Marie-Andree Levesque *Alternate

Weightlifting

Canada sent a team of 15 weightlifters to the 2010 Commonwealth Games

Men

Women

Wrestling

Canada sent a team of 16 wrestlers to the 2010 Commonwealth Games.

On October 1, 2010, both John Pineda and Khetag Pliev withdrew due to injuries and were replaced with Promise Mwenga (who is already competing in Greco-Roman) and Korey Jarvis respectively.
Men's Freestyle

Women's Freestyle

Men's Greco-Roman

See also

 2010 Commonwealth Games

References

Nations at the 2010 Commonwealth Games
Canada at the Commonwealth Games
2010 in Canadian sports